|}
John Leslie Stuart MacFarlane (26 March 1919 – 15 January 1986) was an Australian politician. He was the Country Liberal Party member for Elsey in the Northern Territory Legislative Assembly from 1974 to 1983. He was Speaker from 1975 to 1984.

Before his election to parliament, MacFarlane was chair of the "Rights for Whites Committee", which opposed land rights for Aboriginal Australians.

References

1919 births
1986 deaths
 Members of the Northern Territory Legislative Assembly
 Country Liberal Party members of the Northern Territory Legislative Assembly
 Speakers of the Northern Territory Legislative Assembly
20th-century Australian politicians